Fishbone (Bulgarian: Рибена кост) is a 2021 Bulgarian-Romanian fantasy drama film directed by Dragomir Sholev and written by Sholev, Emanuela Dimitrova & Georgi Merdzhanov. Starring Deyan Donkov, Suzy Radichkova & Valentin Andreev. The film was named on the shortlist for Bulgarian's entry for the Academy Award for Best International Feature Film at the 95th Academy Awards, but it was not selected. It was considered again when Mother was disqualified, however, it was not selected.

Synopsis 
9 situations where people are pushed to react, but they are confused, scared or too busy. 9 viewpoint towards an absurd world, in which people are like a dead dolphin - and nobody knows how to take care of it.

Cast 
The actors participating in this film are:

 Deyan Donkov as Ivo
 Suzy Radichkova as Katya
 Valentin Andreev – Rafe as Grandpa Chavo

Release 
The film had its international premiere at the end of September 2021 at Golden Rose National Film Festival. The film was commercially released on March 25, 2022, in Romanian theaters and on November 4, 2022, in Bulgarian theaters.

Awards

References

External links 

 

2021 films
2021 fantasy films
2021 drama films
Bulgarian fantasy drama films
Romanian fantasy drama films
2020s Bulgarian-language films
Films set in Bulgaria
Films shot in Bulgaria